KAPO Avia was a large global cargo airline with its main base in Moscow (DME) and a secondary base in Kazan. It operated a fleet of ex-passenger (converted) Ilyushin Il-62M aircraft with a maintenance base capable of maintaining both the Il-62 and the Tupolev Tu-214. KAPO was one of the top ten largest freight carriers in Russia and was owned by the Kazan Aircraft Production Association who manufacture and/or maintain the Tupolev Tu-214, Tupolev Tu-334 and Ilyushin Il-62.

Destinations
Belarus:
 Minsk

China:
 Shanghai
 Shijiazhuang
 Tianjin
 Ürümqi

Egypt:
 Cairo

Estonia:
 Tallinn

Hungary:
 Budapest

India:
 Delhi

Iraq:
 Baghdad

Kazakhstan:
 Karaganda

Lithuania:
 Kaunas

Moldova:
 Chisinau

Russia:
 Anadyr (town)
 Kazan
 Khabarovsk
 Krasnoyarsk
 Magadan
 Moscow
 Norilsk
 Novosibirsk
 Petropavlovsk-Kamchatsky
 St Petersburg
 Yakutsk
 Yuzhno-Sakhalinsk

Turkey:
 Istanbul

Ukraine:
 Dnipro

United Arab Emirates:
 Dubai
 Sharjah

Fleet

External links

Homepage (Russian) - http://www.kapoavia.ru

References

Defunct airlines of Russia
Companies based in Tyumen Oblast